K-Mile Air is a Thai-registered express cargo airline based at Suvarnabhumi Airport. It was established in 2004 and began operations in 2006.

K-Mile Air business model focused on the needs of air express, courier and postal companies who require customized charter cargo transportation. It provides both scheduled and charter cargo flights to South East Asia and other routes within the region. In addition to its scheduled operation the airline continues to offer charter flights across its network serving Thailand, Vietnam, Cambodia, Hong Kong, Indonesia, Singapore, and Bangladesh. 

K-Mile Air's current fleet comprises with three Boeing 737-400F and two Boeing 737-800F to cater to the growing intra-Asia airfreight.

Destinations
K-Mile Air operates to the following destinations:

Fleet
K-Mile Air fleet consists of the following aircraft:

References

Airlines of Thailand
Cargo airlines of Thailand
Airlines established in 2006
Companies based in Bangkok
Thai companies established in 2006